Murphy Lakes is a reservoir in Catoosa County, Georgia, United States. Murphy Lakes lie at an elevation of 748 feet (228 m).

References

Reservoirs in Georgia (U.S. state)
Protected areas of Catoosa County, Georgia
Bodies of water of Catoosa County, Georgia